Vangapandu (Telugu: వంగపండు) is one of the Indian surnames.
 Vangapandu Appalaswamy, Indian writer.
 Vangapandu Narayanappala Naidu, Member of Andhra Pradesh Legislative Assembly elected from Gajapathinagaram in 1978 and 1985. 
 Vangapandu Prasada Rao, is an Indian poet, lyricist and actor. 

Indian surnames